The 1978–79 Arkansas Razorbacks men's basketball team represented the University of Arkansas in the 1978–79 college basketball season. The Razorbacks played their home games in Barnhill Arena in Fayetteville, Arkansas. Arkansas competed in the Southwest Conference. It was Eddie Sutton's fifth season as head coach of the Razorbacks. The Razorbacks won a share of the Southwest Conference championship, going 13–3 in league play and finishing with an overall record of 25–5. Arkansas shared the league crown with Texas, whom they beat in the 1979 SWC tournament championship game to clinch a berth to the NCAA tournament. Arkansas earned the 2 seed in the tournament's Midwest region, receiving a first-round bye and advancing to the Elite Eight after beating Weber State in the second round and #13 Louisville in the Sweet Sixteen before losing to Larry Bird and #1 Indiana State in a controversial outcome after a missed tripping call late in the game.

1979 was Arkansas's third consecutive and seventeenth overall SWC championship, as well as its second SWC Tournament championship. The run to the Elite Eight came as part of the Razorbacks' seventh appearance in the NCAA Tournament, also making the tournament the previous two seasons. 1979 was Sutton's third conference title with Arkansas out of the five he would eventually win in his tenure at Arkansas. Arkansas entered the polls at #20 on December 25, 1978, and would remain ranked the whole season, coming in at #5 in the final AP Poll for the second consecutive year. As the last remaining member of the famed "Triplets" following the departure of All-Americans and NBA Draft picks Ron Brewer and Marvin Delph, Sidney Moncrief was named an All-American for the second consecutive year and was drafted fifth overall by the Milwaukee Bucks in the 1979 NBA Draft, the highest pick in Arkansas history. Senior center Steve Schall was drafted in the fifth round by the San Antonio Spurs. Marvin Delph, a senior on the previous year's team was drafted for a second time by the Boston Celtics in the sixth round.

Roster
Roster retrieved from HogStats.com.

Schedule and Results
Schedule retrieved from HogStats.com.

|-
!colspan=12 style=|Exhibition

|-
!colspan=12 style=|Regular Season

|-
!colspan=12 style=|  SWC tournament

|-
!colspan=12 style=|  NCAA tournament

References

Arkansas Razorbacks
Arkansas Razorbacks men's basketball seasons
Arkansas